John Joseph "Binky" Jones (July 11, 1899 in St. Louis, Missouri – May 13, 1961) was a professional baseball player who played shortstop for the Brooklyn Robins in ten games during the 1924 season.

Jones is notable for being part of one of the oddest trades in baseball history. In 1931, while a member of the minor league Chattanooga Lookouts, he was traded to the Charlotte Hornets in exchange for a turkey. The owner claimed it was because the turkey was having a better year. The turkey was promptly served for dinner to assembled sportswriters, while Jones retired and never played again.

References

External links

1899 births
1961 deaths
Major League Baseball shortstops
Brooklyn Robins players
Baseball players from St. Louis
Toledo Mud Hens players
Jersey City Skeeters players
St. Paul Saints (AA) players
Toronto Maple Leafs (International League) players
Portland Beavers players
Indianapolis Indians players
Rochester Tribe players
Syracuse Stars (minor league baseball) players
New Haven Profs players
Atlanta Crackers players
Chattanooga Lookouts players